Jean-Guy Talamoni (born 6 May 1960) is a French politician and Corsican nationalist, who was President of the Corsican Assembly from 17 December 2015 to 1 July 2021.

References

1960 births
Living people
Presidents of the Corsican Assembly
Members of the Corsican Assembly
Corsican politicians
Corsican nationalists
Corsica Libera politicians
People from Saumur